The Pledge is a panel discussion programme broadcast on Sky News. There are currently ten panellists, five of whom appear on the show each week. They discuss a variety of topics – there is no presenter, so each panellist champions a topic which is then debated.

The programme was first announced in April 2016, and the first episode aired later that month, on 21 April 2016. The show is known for at times being controversial, and debates often get heated.

The Pledge is currently not on air having been suspended in March 2020 due to the COVID-19 pandemic. It is currently unknown when or if the show will return.

Format
Each show comprises five panellists from various professions in the entertainment and journalism industries. Each panellist chooses a subject, then clearly states their argument before passing it to the table. The panellists are then given the chance to challenge the person if they disagree and debate it. Topics discussed cover topical issues in the news such as politics and current affairs.

Broadcasts

The Pledge is pre-recorded on a Thursday in Studio F at Sky Campus in Osterley, and then broadcast on Thursdays at 8pm on Sky News. It is also broadcast on Sundays at 8pm as well as at other times during the week to fill slots.

Current panel

List in alphabetical order.

 Lord Karan Bilimoria, entrepreneur and founder of Cobra Beer
 ‘Big’ Phil Campion, former SAS trooper and author
 Michelle Dewberry, businesswoman and winner of The Apprentice 
 Greg Dyke, former TV executive and FA chairman
 Nick Ferrari, radio talk show host on LBC
 Afua Hirsch, writer and journalist (former Social Affairs and Education Editor at Sky News)
 Rachel Johnson, novelist and journalist
 Carole Malone, TV presenter, broadcaster and journalist
 Maajid Nawaz, columnist, broadcaster and politician
 Femi Oluwole, political campaigner
 Trevor Phillips, broadcaster and writer
 June Sarpong, TV presenter and pro-EU campaigner
 Rachel Shabi, journalist

Original panel

List in alphabetical order.

 Emma Barnett, broadcaster and journalist
 James Caan, entrepreneur and former Dragons’ Den investor
 Michelle Dewberry
 Greg Dyke
 Nick Ferrari  
 Rachel Johnson, journalist
 Graeme Le Saux, former Chelsea and England footballer
 Baroness Mone, Baroness of Mayfair and entrepreneur
 June Sarpong

Transmissions

Series

References

External links
Sky News
The Pledge (Facebook)
The Pledge (Twitter)

2016 British television series debuts
2020s British television series
Sky News
Sky UK original programming
English-language television shows
Sky television news shows